Gurutzeta/Cruces is a station on line 2 of the Bilbao metro. It is located in the neighborhood of Gurutzeta, in the municipality of Barakaldo. The station is located in near proximity to the University Hospital of Gurutzeta (also known as Hospital de Cruces in Spanish), the largest public healthcare facility in the Basque Country. The station was opened on 13 April 2002, as part of the opening of line 2.

The trip from San Ignazio to Gurutzeta/Cruces takes four minutes, making it the longest interval between underground stations throughout the entire Bilbao metro network. It is one of four stations located in Barakaldo, the other being Ansio, Bagatza and Barakaldo.

Station layout 

Gurutzeta/Cruces station follows the typical cavern-shaped layout of most underground Metro Bilbao stations designed by Norman Foster, with the main hall located directly above the rail tracks.

Access 

  Gurutzeta - Hospital (Gurutzeta/Cruces exit)
  Llano St. (Llano exit, closed during night time services)
   Balejo St.

Services 
The station is served by line 2 from Basauri to Kabiezes. The station is also served by Bizkaibus regional bus services.

References

External links
 

Line 2 (Bilbao metro) stations
Railway stations in Spain opened in 2002
2002 establishments in the Basque Country (autonomous community)
Barakaldo